Hammam Essalihine ( Ḥammām aṣ-Ṣāliḥīn, lit. "The Bath of the Righteous") is an ancient Roman bath situated in the Aurès Mountains in the El Hamma District in the Khenchela Province of Algeria. As the Latin name suggests, it dates from the time of the Flavian Dynasty.

See also
 List of Roman public baths

External links 
 Compilation of images, videos, maps of articles on Hammam Essalihine

Archaeological sites in Algeria
Ancient Roman baths
Former populated places in Algeria
Buildings and structures in Khenchela Province
Buildings and structures completed in the 1st century